Rhyse may refer to:

 Rhyse Martin (born 1993), Papuan rugby league football player
 Rhyse, Missouri, U.S.

See also

 
 Rhyce Shaw (born 1981), Australian rules football player
 Rhys, a name
 Rice (disambiguation)
 Rise (disambiguation)
 Ryce, a surname
 Rys (disambiguation)
 Ryse (disambiguation)